Marlène Olivia Harnois (born 22 October 1986) is a Canadian-born French taekwondo Olympic medalist, TV personality, philanthropist and a Knight of the Order of Merit, decorated by the President of France.

She is a Champion for Peace representing the Peace and Sport Organisation under the High Patronage of H.H. Prince Albert II of Monaco. She is also  a member of the Canadian Olympic Committee, the European Taekwondo Union and a board member of the French Olympian Association.

In addition she is two times European Champion, World University Champion, a World Taekwondo Championships medalist and has reached the world number one ranking.

Highly involved in the development of sport in West Africa and mentoring young prodigies Cheick Cissé and Ruth Gbagbi, she contributed to the historical victory of Ivory Coast at the 2016 Rio Summer Olympics.

In 2018, during the celebration of the International Day for Philosophy at the UNESCO, she was announced as the Ambassador of the International center for youth philosophy "PhiloJeunes".

In 2020, she earned an MBA Degree with honours from the International University of Monaco.

Honours 
On 1 March 2013, Harnois received the distinction of Chevalier de l'Ordre National du Mérite, awarded by the President of France, François Hollande, at the Élysée Palace.

In 2018, she was decorated by United Nations peacekeeping forces alongside singer and philanthropist Akon for her contribution in Africa.

Charity work, endorsements and other media  

In 2014, she founded in Abidjan, Ivory Coast the Fondation Heart Angel in order to promote education, culture and Sport in West Africa and support the youth in the realisation of their dreams. At the 2016 Rio Summer Olympics, Cheick Cissé and Ruth Gbagbi, athletes supported by the foundation, won historical medals. The gold medalist in taekwondo - 80 kilos, Cissé, became the first Olympic champion in the history of the Ivory Coast, and Gbagbi, bronze medalist in taekwondo -67 kilos, became the first female Olympic medalist.

In 2016, Harnois became a Champion for Peace representing the Peace and Sport organisation, under the High Patronage of Prince Albert II of Monaco. She actively promotes peace through sport and doing field actions all over the world.

In parallel to her sport career, she obtained a BA in Journalism and Communications at the Centre de Formation de Journalistes de Paris, starred in an advertising campaign for Allianz with Ladji Doucouré and Blune with Mazarine Pingeot, and worked for various media outlets such as Eurosport, Canal+ Africa and France Televisions, covering the 2016 Rio Summer Olympics. She is also involved with various foundations and is an ambassador for "Un Maillot Pour la Vie" and Fondation Heart Angel.

She is also the Founder and President of the Caravan for Peace, a humanitarian action supported by athletes such as Didier Drogba, Ladji Doucouré and Daba Modibo Keita. The goal is to unite Champions to promote a message of peace and use sport as a tool for development. In 2017, for the first edition, the Champions visited villages in Senegal and launched water fountains near sports fields. 

In 2018, during the celebration of the International Day for Philosophy at the UNESCO, she was announced as the Ambassador of the International center for youth philosophy "PhiloJeunes".

Beginnings

Harnois discovered Taekwondo at the age of four with her older sister Stéphanie. Both enrolled in a neighbourhood club located on the south shore of Montreal. She earned her black belt at age nine and quickly stood out at provincial and national levels. In her youth, she also won competitions in other sports including a Quebec Championship in fencing (foil), and in handball (with the high school team of Pierre-Brosseau, where she was enrolled in sports studies program), as well as several snowboard competitions.

Taekwondo
Canadian Team
In 1997, in her first participation, she won the Canadian Junior National Taekwondo Championships. After three years of consecutive years of winning the National Championship, she made her debut on the international scene and won the 1999 US Open. At age 13, Harnois was selected to represent Canada at the 2000 World Junior Championships in Killarney, Ireland, and won the bronze medal. The Canadian martial art prodigy immediately gained international attention within her sport.

Journey in France (2001–2002)
As part of the International Francophone Solidarity program, the French Taekwondo Federation (FFTDA) offered Harnois the opportunity to join the French training center for the 2001-2002 sport season. The then 14-year-old athlete decided to move to Europe in order to reach her goals. In France, she trained at the Aix-en-Provence training center (CREPS) with Pascal Gentil (twice Olympic medalist) and Mamedy Doucara (welterweight World Champion 2001). She won the Francophone World Cup in the -67 kg division and received the title of "MVP, Best Fighter".

Athletic career on hold (2002–2005)
One year into the International Solidarity Francophone program, established by the FFTDA, Harnois returned to Canada and won the Korea Open in 2003.

Back to France (2006)
Harnois accepted a proposition made by the French Taekwondo Federation and moved back to France to train at the National Olympic Center. She joined the group led by Myriam Baverel at the Aix-en-Provence training center (CREPS) and won all the International Open Championships: the Mexico World Open, Dutch Open, Israel Open, Spanish Open, Andorra Cup, and Bilbao Open. At the same time, she pursued her scholarship and earned a certificate in physical education and a master's degree (bac+4) in sport management. In 2008, just days after receiving her French naturalization, Harnois won the European Championships in the -63 kg category.

Olympic preparation (2008–2012)
In 2008, Harnois joined the National Institute of Sport, Expertise and Performance (INSEP) in Paris to prepare for the London Olympics. Two times European Champion, World university Champion and medalist, she dominated the international scene and won the US Open, Russia Open, Israel Open, Paris International Tournament, and Deutsch Open, and medalled at the World Taekwondo Championships. She also won an Olympic quota for France at the World Olympic Qualification Tournament in Kazan, Russia.

2012 Summer Olympics
Harnois won a bronze medal at the 2012 London Summer Olympics. She beat Yeny Contreras in the first round, followed by Hedaya Wahba in the quarter-finals. She then lost to Hou Yuzhuo in the semi-finals. This enabled her to take part in the bronze medal repechage, where she beat Mayu Hamada.

Results

2012
  2012 Summer Olympics in London, UK
  2012 European Taekwondo Championships in Manchester, England
  US Open in Las Vegas, USA
  World Team Championship in Santa Cruz, Aruba
2011
  2011 Summer Universiade in Shenzhen, China
  2011 World Taekwondo Championships in Gyeongju, South Korea
  French National Championships
  Russia Open
  Israel Open
  Tournoi International de Paris

2010
  Tournoi International de Paris
  French National Championships
  2010 European Taekwondo Championships in Saint Petersburg, Russia
  European Team Cup

2009
  2011 Summer Universiade in Belgrade, Serbia

2008
  2008 European Taekwondo Championships in Rome
  Deutsch Open

2007
  World Open Mexico
  Spanish Open
  Jerusalem Open

2006
  Copa d’Andorra
  Jerusalem Open
  Bilbao Open

Also
  Junior Taekwondo Championships, Killarney - Ireland (2000)
  Korea Open (2003)
  Francophone World Cup (2002)
  US Open (1999)
  Canadian National Championships (1997 to 2002)

References

External links 
 
 
 
 
 
 

1986 births
Living people
French female taekwondo practitioners
French people of Canadian descent
People from Saint-Lambert, Quebec
Sportspeople from Montreal
Taekwondo practitioners at the 2012 Summer Olympics
Olympic taekwondo practitioners of France
Olympic bronze medalists for France
Olympic medalists in taekwondo
Medalists at the 2012 Summer Olympics
Knights of the Ordre national du Mérite
Universiade medalists in taekwondo
Universiade gold medalists for France
Universiade bronze medalists for France
World Taekwondo Championships medalists
European Taekwondo Championships medalists
Medalists at the 2009 Summer Universiade
Medalists at the 2011 Summer Universiade